Son of the Border is a 1933 American Pre-Code Western film directed by Lloyd Nosler, written by Wellyn Totman, and starring Tom Keene, Julie Haydon, Edgar Kennedy, Lon Chaney, Jr. and David Durand. It was released on May 5, 1933 by RKO Pictures.

Plot

Cast
 Tom Keene as Tom Owens 
 Edgar Kennedy as Windy
 Julie Haydon as Doris
 David Durand as Frankie Breen
 Lon Chaney, Jr. as Jack Breen 
 Al Bridge as Tupper
 Charles King as Henchey
 Claudia Coleman as Sadie

References

External links
 
 
 
 

1933 films
American black-and-white films
RKO Pictures films
American Western (genre) films
1933 Western (genre) films
Films scored by Arthur Lange
1930s English-language films
Films directed by Lloyd Nosler
1930s American films